Nizhal Nijamagiradhu is a 1978 Indian Tamil-language film, directed by K. Balachander, starring Kamal Haasan, Sarath Babu, Sumithra and Hanumanthu, and introduced Sobha. It was a remake of the Malayalam film Adimakal.

Plot 

Venkatachalam (Sarath Babu) and Indumathi (Sumithra) are siblings. Indumathi hates men and she is adamant that she will never get married. Sanjeevi (Kamal) is a friend of Venkatachalam and often visits his house. Sanjeevi likes Indumathi's attitude and starts teasing her many times, they often quarrel as well. Though Indumathi too starts liking him, she is too egotistical to show her romantic side to Sanjeevi as she doesn't want to remove her stubborn attitude "mask".

Thilagam (Sobha) is a young girl from the village who comes to work as a servant in Venkatachalam's house. Her innocence draws Venkatachalam towards her and they get intimate. She becomes pregnant, but Venkatachalam refuses her. Thilagam is driven out of Venkatachalam's house and gets support from Sanjeevi and Kasi (Hanumanthu), a person who is hard of hearing, who also worked at Venkatachalam's house and has affection towards Thilagam. Sanjeevi provides Thilagam with lodging and requests Kasi to stay with her and look after her. Thilagam delivers a child.

Months later, after Sanjeevi and Kasi appealed to his conscience, Venkatachalam repents and is ready to accept Thilagam, but she decides to live her life with Kasi, who took care of her during her pregnancy. Indumathi, meanwhile, throws away her "stubborn" mask and asks Sanjeevi to accept her. Sanjeevi accepts her love.

Cast 
Kamal Haasan as Sanjeevi
Sumithra as Indumathi
Sobha as Thilagam
Sarath Babu as Venkatachalam
Hanumanthu as Kasi
T. S. B. K. Moulee as Manmatha Naidu
Oru Viral Krishna Rao as Kalimuthu
M. S. Sundari Bai as Ponnamma
K. Natraj as Ayyavu

Production 
Sarath Babu was given a role in the film, after Balachander saw him at a function. His first shot was at Hyderabad. Balachandar cast Malayalam actress Shoba in a pivotal role in the film, but the delayed release of the film meant that Karaikkudi Narayanan's Achaani (1978) marked Shobha's debut as a lead actress in Tamil. Balachander gave T. S. B. K. Moulee, who had directed films under Balachander's banner, the role of a "women-obsessed local tattler". Balachander, who used to watch Moulee's plays, liked his style of writing and wanted him to write a comedy track for the film. Mouli said that he was given the liberty by Balachander to insert comedy sequences wherever he wanted and that he wrote 16 scenes for the film.

Balachander stated that he had an egotistical girl (Sumitra) fall for the macho antics of the hero (Kamal Hassan) "to lend credence and strength to the plot. Also, she provided a perfect contrast to the innocent victim Shobha, the other character".

Soundtrack 
The music for this film was composed by M. S. Viswanathan.

Reception 
Actor Maadhu Balaji said, "I must have watched Nizhal Nijamagiradhu 40 to 50 times". In 2008, actor and TV host Bosskey named Nizhal Nijamagiradhu among his three most favourite films. In 2005, Kamal Haasan stated that Nizhal Nijamagirathu was far superior to Maro Charitra, another Balachander film he was also part of, which was highly acclaimed and very successful.

References

External links 
 

1970s Tamil-language films
1978 films
Films directed by K. Balachander
Films scored by M. S. Viswanathan
Films with screenplays by K. Balachander
Indian black-and-white films
Tamil remakes of Malayalam films